Pia Merete Tjelta (born 12 September 1977, in Stavanger) is a Norwegian actress.

Tjelta graduated from the Norwegian National Academy of Theatre in 2006, but had already appeared in many films. She made her film debut in 2001 in the film Mongoland. She entered the Norwegian National Academy of Theatre in 2000, but after taking a two-year maternity leave, she did not manage to graduate until 2006. In 2005, she also worked on the jury of the TV series Filmstjerne on TV 2.

She made her stage debut in 2006 with the play Fyrverkerimakarens dotter at Det Norske Teatret. In 2007 she starred in the play "Få meg på, for faen" (based on the Norwegian book by the same name) at Det Norske Teatret, where she played Maria.

In February 2007, she received much media coverage for her lead role in the Norwegian romantic comedy Mars og Venus. The film was described as the year's big feelgood film.

In 2014, she teamed up with designer Tine Mollatt to create a dress collection.

Filmography
Mongoland (2001), Pia
Buddy (2003), Henriette
Kvinnen i mitt liv (2003), Maria
Monstertorsdag (2004), Russian potato seller
An Enemy of the People (2005), Petra
37 og et halvt (2005), Michelle
5 løgner (2007)
Mars & Venus (2007), Ida
Kodenavn Hunter (2008) (TV)
Lønsj (2008), Heidi
Varg Veum - Falne Engler (2008), Rebecca
90 minutes (2012), Elin
Neste Sommer (TV series) (2014-2019), Anki
Blind Spot (2018), Marie
State of Happiness (2018, 2022), Ingrid Nymann
Norsemen (TV series) (2020), Dragon Rider
Made in Oslo (TV series) (2022), Elin

References

External links
 
Agent home page
Millionstøtte til vågal Pia Tjelta-film (Dagbladet, 2006)
Spiller ungjente (SeHer.no, 2006)
Privilegerte Pia (Universitas, 2006)
Venner for livet (Dagbladet, intervju, 2003)

1977 births
Living people
People from Stavanger
Norwegian film actresses
Oslo National Academy of the Arts alumni
Norwegian stage actresses